Egg Island (Sugpiaq: Qangyutilim Qikertaa) is a small island in the Fox Islands subgroup of the Aleutian Islands in the U.S. state of Alaska. It lies off the eastern end of Unalaska Island and just off the northeastern tip of Sedanka Island. It is the easternmost island in the Aleutians West Census Area of Alaska. The island has a land area of 311.12 acres (1.259 km2) and is uninhabited.

Its present name is a translation of the Russian name given by Lt. Sarichev (1826, map 14, dated 1792) of the Imperial Russian Navy. Sarichev named it "Ostrov Yaichnoy," meaning "Island of Egg." Sarichev also called the island "Ostrov Ugalgan" or "Ugalgan Island ," probably from Capt. Lt. Krenitzin, IRN, 1768 (Coxe, 1787, Chart 2)

References

Further reading
 Egg Island: Block 2000, Census Tract 2, Aleutians West Census Area, Alaska United States Census Bureau

Islands of Aleutians West Census Area, Alaska
Fox Islands (Alaska)
Uninhabited islands of Alaska
Islands of Alaska
Islands of Unorganized Borough, Alaska